The Death of Stalin is a 2017 political satire black comedy film written and directed by Armando Iannucci and co-written by David Schneider and Ian Martin with Peter Fellows. Based on the French graphic novel La Mort de Staline (2010–2012), the film depicts the internal social and political power struggle among the Council of Ministers following the death of Soviet leader Joseph Stalin in 1953. The British-French-Belgian co-production stars an ensemble cast that includes Steve Buscemi, Simon Russell Beale, Paddy Considine, Rupert Friend, Jason Isaacs, Michael Palin, Andrea Riseborough, Paul Whitehouse, Olga Kurylenko, and Jeffrey Tambor.

The Death of Stalin was screened at the 2017 Toronto International Film Festival and received critical acclaim. It was released in the United Kingdom by Entertainment One Films on 20 October 2017, in France by Gaumont on 4 April 2018 and in Belgium by September Film Distribution on 18 April 2018. It received various awards, including two British Academy Film Award nominations for Outstanding British Film as well as 13 British Independent Film Award nominations winning four awards including for Simon Russell Beale for Best Supporting Actor.

The film was met with fierce opposition in Russia, which deemed it "anti-Russian propaganda", and it was subsequently banned in Russia and Kyrgyzstan for allegedly mocking the Soviet past and making fun of the USSR.

Plot
Joseph Stalin, calling from Kuntsevo Dacha whilst hosting the Central Committee, demands a recording of Radio Moscow's live recital of Mozart's Piano Concerto No. 23. Having not been recorded in the first place, the sound engineers hurriedly have the orchestra perform again; to this end, they fill the now-half-empty venue with people pulled in off the street to replicate the acoustics, and replace the now-unconscious conductor with another due to be purged, who is forced to conduct in his pyjamas. However, pianist Maria Yudina hides a note for Stalin in the record sleeve admonishing him and expressing her hope for his death. As the Central Committee members leave, NKVD head Lavrentiy Beria reveals to Nikita Khrushchev and Deputy Chairman Georgy Malenkov that Foreign Minister Vyacheslav Molotov is to be purged. When the record arrives, Stalin finds the note; as he reads it, he laughs hysterically, but suffers a cerebral haemorrhage in the process.

Out of fear of punishment, Stalin's guards do not enter the office despite having heard him fall; in the morning, his housekeeper is the first to discover him unconscious. The Central Committee is notified and they rush to the dacha; Beria, who has had the NKVD take over the Soviet Army-held security postings across Moscow, is the first to arrive and finds Yudina's note. After the rest of the Committee, including Lazar Kaganovich, Anastas Mikoyan, and Nikolai Bulganin, arrive, they collectively decide to send for a team of doctors despite all of the best in the Moscow area having been purged. Stalin has a bout of terminal lucidity, but he eventually dies, fulfilling Yudina's wish. The Committee returns to Moscow as the NKVD loots the dacha and Beria has the order to execute Molotov stricken.

Khrushchev and Beria vie for the support of Stalin's children, Svetlana and her alcoholic brother, Vasily. However, Khrushchev fails to secure Molotov's allegiance as a result of Molotov's dislike of factionalism, which is compounded by Beria releasing his wife, Polina Zhemchuzhina, from prison. While the Committee names Malenkov chairman, he is essentially a puppet of Beria, who further exerts control by hijacking Khrushchev's proposed reforms, releasing political prisoners, loosening clergical restrictions, and relegating him to planning Stalin's funeral. Marshal Georgy Zhukov is irate over the supplanting of the military by the NKVD and he and Khrushchev are further incensed upon discovering that Beria has halted all transportation into Moscow. However, Beria learns that Khrushchev and Yudina, who is due to play at the funeral, are known to be acquainted, and threatens both with the release of her note to Stalin.

Zhukov and Molotov, the latter having been disillusioned by Beria's lifting of restrictions on the Church, both agree to support Khrushchev in a coup against Beria as long as the rest of the Committee is in unanimous support. Beria's authority is further undermined when Khrushchev surreptitiously has the travel ban lifted and the NKVD massacres 1,500 arriving mourners. The Committee decides to blame junior NKVD officers, but Beria angrily dissents under the belief that he will be held culpable anyway, and he threatens them with documents detailing their involvement in various purges.

On the day of the funeral, Khrushchev lies to Zhukov and Molotov about having secured the rest of the Committee's support, prompting the Soviet Army's reclamation of its posts and the mass arrests of NKVD personnel, including Beria, with Leonid Brezhnev's personal assistance. Malenkov hesitantly throws his lot in with the anti-Beria camp at Khrushchev's urging, and he reluctantly signs Beria's death warrant. At Beria's hasty trial, Khrushchev accuses Beria of sexual assault, pedophilia, and treason, charges that elicit disgust from the various attending officials and military officers, and sentences him to death. Beria is shot in the head, and Zhukov cremates him with a lighter and gasoline. Khrushchev sends Svetlana to Vienna despite her protests, and concurs with Kaganovich and Molotov that Malenkov is unfit to lead.

Several years later, Yudina performs Concerto No. 23 again with Khrushchev, now leader of the Soviet Union in the wake of his removal of Malenkov and Molotov, in attendance. His future successor, Brezhnev, watches him from the row of seats above.

Cast

Production
The project began development during the 2016 Cannes Film Festival. Armando Iannucci was set as director and writer, alongside his The Thick of It co-writer Ian Martin. Production was due to begin in June, with Jeffrey Tambor, Steve Buscemi, Olga Kurylenko, Timothy Dalton, Toby Kebbell, Michael Palin, Simon Russell Beale, Paddy Considine and Andrea Riseborough among the cast. Production began on June 20, with Adrian McLoughlin, Rupert Friend, Jason Isaacs and Paul Whitehouse joining the cast. Dalton and Kebbell, who were originally respectively cast as Georgy Zhukov and Vasily Stalin, ultimately did not appear in the film.

Production ended 6 August 2016.

Filming locations included Kyiv, Ukraine (for exteriors scenes and exterior of Public Enemies building and NKVD building), the United Kingdom (at Blythe House, Freemasons' Hall and Alexandra Palace in London, Mongewell Park in Oxfordshire, Hammersmith Town Hall in London), and in Moscow, Russia, at the Red Gate Building.

The soundtrack was composed by Christopher Willis. The score was written in the style of Soviet composer Dmitri Shostakovich of the Stalin era.

Release

Box office 
The Death of Stalin was released by eOne Films in the United Kingdom on 20 October 2017 and IFC Films in the United States on 9 March 2018. The film was screened in the Platform section at the 2017 Toronto International Film Festival.

The Death of Stalin grossed $8 million in the United States and Canada and $16.6 million in other territories (including $7.3 million in the UK), for a worldwide total of $24.6 million.

Reception

Critical response
On the review aggregator website Rotten Tomatoes, the film holds an approval rating of 95% based on 252 reviews, with an average rating of 8/10. The website's critical consensus reads, "The Death of Stalin finds director/co-writer Armando Iannucci in riotous form, bringing his scabrous political humor to bear on a chapter in history with painfully timely parallels." On Metacritic the film has a weighted average score of 88 out of 100, based on 43 critics, indicating "universal acclaim".

In The Guardian, Peter Bradshaw gave the film 5/5 stars, writing that "fear rises like gas from a corpse in Armando Iannucci's brilliant horror-satire" and that it "is superbly cast, and acted with icy and ruthless force by an A-list lineup. There are no weak links. Each has a plum role; each squeezes every gorgeous horrible drop." Sandra Hall of The Sydney Morning Herald gave the film 4.5/5 stars, describing the film as "a devastatingly funny dissection of power politics, stripping the mystique from it and those who worship it." Donald Clarke of The Irish Times gave the film 4/5 stars, writing that it "starts in a state of mortal panic and continues in that mode towards its inevitably ghastly conclusion". Tim Robey of The Daily Telegraph also gave the film 4/5 stars, writing: "Depending on your point of view, The Death of Stalin is either a sly, wintry satire on Armando Iannucci's usual theme of squawking political idiocy, or an insidious attempt to destabilise the Russian establishment with relentless dagger-blows." Peter Howell of the Toronto Star gave the film 3.5/4 stars, writing: "Shifting eastwards from the Anglo-American japes of In the Loop and Veep, director/co-writer Armando Iannucci doesn’t stint on brutal truth — or lethal legend."

Christopher Orr of The Atlantic praised the film's humour and the performances of the cast, and wrote that the film "seems precisely attuned to the current moment: a capricious, unpredictable leader, basking in a cult of personality; the introduction of "alternative facts"; the swift, party-wide swerves on subjects as various as negotiating with North Korea, paying off porn stars, and even Russian efforts to subvert a U.S. election." Anthony Lane of The New Yorker wrote that the film was "ten times funnier, by my reckoning, than it has any right to be, and more riddled with risk than anything that Iannucci has done before, because it dares to meet outrage with outrage." Raphael Abraham of the Financial Times wrote: "As this coven of vampiric apparatchiks feasts on the remains of Stalinism, the unremitting blackness of the situation at times threatens a full comedy eclipse. But the discomfiting balancing act of humour and horror is precisely Iannucci's game—and only he could pull it off with such skill." Thomas Walker, in a review for The Objective Standard, agreed, and added that the film "dives deep into the psychology of those living under such a system and lays bare the self-destructive mind-set of those who grasp wildly for power."

Matthew Norman of the Evening Standard gave the film 3/5 stars, writing: "For all [Iannucci's] dream-team cast and assured direction, despite capturing the laughable sycophancy of the apparatchik the film isn't that funny." Peter Debruge of Variety wrote: "If only the end result were as funny as the idea that anyone would undertake a film about the turmoil surrounding the Soviet despot's demise."

Former U.S. President Barack Obama included The Death of Stalin as one of his favourite films of 2018.

Russia and former Soviet bloc 
Nikolai Starikov, head of the Russian Great Fatherland Party, said The Death of Stalin was an "unfriendly act by the British intellectual class" and part of an "anti-Russian information war". In September 2017 the head of the Public Council of the Russian Ministry of Culture said Russian authorities were considering a ban on the film, alleging the film could be part of a "western plot to destabilise Russia by causing rifts in society". Russian online newspaper Vzglyad called the movie “a nasty sendup by outsiders who know nothing of our history”.  The Communist Party of the Russian Federation called the film “revolting". Alexander Yushchenko, a spokesman for the party, said the film was an attempt to spark discontent.

On 23 January 2018, two days before the film's scheduled release in Russia, a screening was attended by State Duma MPs, representatives of the Russian Historical Society, members of the Culture Ministry's Public Board, and film industry members. Two days later, the Ministry of Culture withdrew the film's distribution certificate. Nevertheless, several cinemas screened the film in late January, claiming that they had not heard that the movie's exhibition license had been revoked by then. Russia's culture ministry sued these theatres. According to the results of a poll conducted by the state-run Russian Public Opinion Research Center (VTSIOM), 35% of Russians disapproved of the Culture Ministry's decision to pull the film off the screens, while 30% supported the ban and 35% were neutral. 58% of Russians said they would be willing to watch the film in cinemas if the ban were lifted. The film has been illegally downloaded around 1.5 million times in Russia.

A group of lawyers from Russia's Ministry of Culture, the daughter of Zhukov, Era Zhukova, cinematographers Nikita Mikhalkov, Vladimir Bortko, and head of the Russian State Historical Museum Alexey Levykin, petitioned Culture Minister Vladimir Medinsky to withdraw the film's certification, saying "The Death of Stalin is aimed at inciting hatred and enmity, violating the dignity of the Russian (Soviet) people, promoting ethnic and social inferiority. We are confident that the movie was made to distort our country's past so that the thought of the 1950s Soviet Union makes people feel only terror and disgust." The authors said the film denigrated the memory of Russian World War II fighters, with the Russian national anthem accompanied by obscene expressions and offensive attitudes, historically inaccurate decorations, and the planned release on the eve of the 75th anniversary of the Battle of Stalingrad. The film was banned in Russia, Kazakhstan and Kyrgyzstan. Armenia and Belarus were the only members of the Eurasian Economic Union to show it. In Armenia the film premiered in two cinemas in Yerevan on 25 January 2018. In Belarus the film premiered after an initial delay. In Kazakhstan the film was screened only at the Clique festival.

Awards and honours

Historical accuracy
Several academics have pointed to historical inaccuracies in The Death of Stalin. Iannucci has responded, "I'm not saying it's a documentary. It  a fiction, but it's a fiction inspired by the truth of what it must have felt like at the time. My aim is for the audience to feel the sort of low-level anxiety that people must have when they just went about their daily lives at the time."

Historian Richard Overy has written that the film "is littered with historical errors" and that "it is entertainment, but poor history", including:
 Molotov was not the foreign minister when Stalin died. He had been sacked in 1949 but became foreign minister again in the post-Stalin reshuffle.
 Marshal (not Field Marshal) Zhukov was a local field commander when Stalin died, exiled to the provinces to satisfy Stalin's paranoid jealousy of him. He became deputy minister of defence in the post-Stalin government. However, he was not the commander of the Soviet Army in March 1953.
 Khrushchev, not Malenkov, chaired the meeting to reorganise the government.
 Beria was arrested three months after Stalin died, not almost simultaneously, and that was precipitated by the 1953 East German uprising, not a massacre of mourners in Moscow, which is based on the 109 who were trampled to death during the funeral. Furthermore, Beria was not head of the security forces, a job he gave up in 1946.
 Svetlana was not sent to Vienna. She remained in the Soviet Union working as an academic and translator before ultimately defecting to America in 1967 and becoming a naturalised citizen in 1978.

Overy wrote that those killed in the Great Purge or sent to Gulags "deserve a film that treats their history with greater discretion and historical understanding". Iannucci said he "chose to tone down real-life absurdity" to make the work more believable.

The Radio Moscow portion is a retelling of an apocryphal story first recorded in Solomon Volkov's book Testimony. However, in Volkov's account, Maria Yudina was awakened in the middle of the night in 1943 or 1944 (not 1953) to be brought in to record. The recording brought Stalin to tears, moving him to pay Yudina 20,000 roubles in appreciation. The story subsequently served as the loose basis for the 1989 BBC radio play The Stalin Sonata by David Zane Mairowitz. While the anecdote did have her send a letter to Stalin, she supposedly wrote to thank him for the money, adding that she would donate it to the restoration of a church and that she would be praying for Stalin's sins to be forgiven. In addition, while the real Maria Yudina had been fired on one occasion for her ideological disagreements with the regime, her family had not been killed.

Dr. Lydia Timashuk is described in dialog between Beria, Khrushchev, and Malenkov as a willing accomplice in the Doctors' plot (which is already past history in the story) and is portrayed as an eager agent in the roundup of Moscow doctors for Stalin's care who then dies in a mine field around Stalin's dacha after her sexual advances to Beria are rejected. In fact she had no involvement in the events surrounding Stalin's death and was an unwilling pawn in the Doctors' plot who became embittered by the resulting stigmas of informer and anti-Semitism until her death in 1983.

Another smaller historical aspect of the plot was modified for the film, the 1950 Sverdlovsk plane crash in which 11 players on the VVS Moscow ice hockey team died. In the film Vasily Stalin and Anatoly Tarasov deal with a depleted Soviet Union national ice hockey team, complete with a reference to their star player Vsevolod Bobrov, who missed the flight. However, the crash happened on 5 January 1950, more than three years before Stalin's death.

Bogdan Kobulov is depicted as being shot dead during Beria's arrest by officers under orders by Zhukov. In fact he was arrested and executed alongside Beria months later.

The NKVD had been superseded by the MVD in 1946, almost seven years before the death of Stalin.

Samuel Goff, at the Department of Slavonic Studies, University of Cambridge, while saying that the film's historical discrepancies could be justified as helping to focus the drama, wrote that turning Beria into "an avatar of the obscenities of the Stalinist state" missed the chance to say "anything about the actual mechanisms of power." Goff argued that Iannucci's approach to satire was not transferable to something like Stalinism, and the film is "fundamentally ill-equipped to locate the comedy inherent to Stalinism, missing marks it doesn't know it should be aiming for."

References

External links

 
 
 

2010s political films
2017 films
2017 black comedy films
2017 independent films
British black comedy films
British political satire films
Censored films
Cold War films
Cultural depictions of Georgy Zhukov
Cultural depictions of Joseph Stalin
Cultural depictions of Lavrentiy Beria
Cultural depictions of Leonid Brezhnev
Cultural depictions of Nikita Khrushchev
English-language French films
Films about coups d'état
Films about Joseph Stalin
Films about funerals
Films about rape
Films about Soviet repression
Films about the Soviet Union in the Stalin era
Films based on French comics
Films critical of communism
Films directed by Armando Iannucci
Films set in 1953
Films set in Moscow
Films set in the Soviet Union
Films shot in London
Films shot in Ukraine
Films with screenplays by Armando Iannucci
French black comedy films
French political satire films
IFC Films films
Live-action films based on comics
Political films based on actual events
Works banned in Russia
Films shot in Kyiv
Films shot in Moscow
Films shot in Oxfordshire
Film controversies in Russia
Film censorship in Russia
Obscenity controversies in film
2010s English-language films
2010s British films
2010s French films
Comedy films based on actual events
Films shot in Russia